LA-17 is a constituency of Azad Kashmir Legislative Assembly which is currently represented by the Chaudhary Muhammad Yasin Gulshan of Pakistan Muslim League (N). It covers the area of Abbaspur in Poonch District of Azad Kashmir, Pakistan.

Election 2016

elections were held in this constituency on 21 July 2016.

Azad Kashmir Legislative Assembly constituencies
Poonch District, Pakistan